Corydoras bilineatus is a tropical freshwater fish belonging to the Corydoradinae sub-family of the family Callichthyidae. It originates in inland waters in South America. Corydoras bilineatus is found in the Madeira River basin in Bolivia.

References

Reis, R.E., 2003. Callichthyidae (Armored catfishes). p. 291-309. In R.E. Reis, S.O. Kullander and C.J. Ferraris, Jr. (eds.) Checklist of the Freshwater Fishes of South and Central America. Porto Alegre: EDIPUCRS, Brasil.

Corydoras
Catfish of South America
Fish of Bolivia
Taxa named by Joachim Knaack
Fish described in 2002